Astro Kirana was a Malaysian satellite television channel dedicated to airing Asian film, a 24-hour Malaysian film channel owned by Astro, launched on 31 August 2006 alongside Astro Aruna.

External links
 www.astro.com.my

Television channels and stations disestablished in 2009
Astro Malaysia Holdings television channels
Television channels and stations established in 2006